David Bailly (1584–1657) was a Dutch Golden Age painter.

Biography
Bailly was born at Leyden in the Dutch Republic, the son of a Flemish immigrant, calligrapher and fencing master, Peter Bailly. As a draftsman, David was pupil of his father and the copper engraver Jacques de Gheyn.

David Bailly apprenticed with a surgeon-painter Adriaan Verburg in Leiden and then with Cornelius van der Voort, a portrait painter in Amsterdam.  According to Houbraken, in the winter of 1608, Bailly took his Grand Tour, travelling to Frankfurt, Nuremberg, Augsburg Hamburg, and via Tirol to Venice, and from there to Rome. On his return he spent five months in Venice, all the while working as a journeyman where he could, before crossing the alps again in 1609. On his return voyage, Bailly worked for several German princes including the Duke of Brunswick.
Upon his return to the Netherlands in 1613, Bailly began painting still-life subjects and portraits, including self-portraits and portraits of his students and professors at the University of Leiden. He is known for making a number of vanitas paintings depicting transience of this life, with such ephemeral symbols as flowers and candles. In 1648 he became headman of the Leiden Guild of St. Luke.
Bailly taught his nephews Harmen and Pieter Steenwijck.

References

1584 births
1657 deaths
Dutch Golden Age painters
Dutch male painters
Dutch portrait painters
Dutch still life painters
Artists from Leiden
Painters from Leiden